Arthur Groom Parham  (25 June 18838 January 1961) was an English Anglican bishop who was bishop of Reading (a suffragan bishop in the Diocese of Oxford) from 1942 until 1954.

Family and education
Son of Edmund and Ann, Parham was educated at Magdalen College School, Oxford then Exeter College, Oxford (gaining the degree of Oxford Master of Arts). He trained for the ministry at Leeds Clergy School and was ordained a deacon on Trinity Sunday (6 June) 1909 by John Harmer, Bishop of Rochester, at Rochester Cathedral and a priest in 1910.

Ministry pre-war
Beginning his ministry with a curacy at Bromley, Kent (1909–1912), he was then appointed chaplain and precentor of Christ Church Cathedral and chaplain of Magdalen College, Oxford (all 1912–1921); that period was interrupted with World War I service as a temporary chaplain to the Forces during which he was twice mentioned in despatches and awarded the Military Cross.

Ministry in Berkshire
When peace returned, he became rector of Easthampstead (1921–1926), then vicar of St Mary's, Reading (1926–1946; both in Berkshire), and additionally rural dean of Reading (1934–1942); during this period his became an honorary canon of Christ Church (1934 onwards) and was first elected a proctor in convocation (1935–1954). Remaining, to start with, vicar of Reading, he became also archdeacon of Berkshire and bishop of Reading (a suffragan bishop of the diocese), both from 1942 to 1954. He was ordained and consecrated a bishop by Cosmo Lang, archbishop of Canterbury, at St Paul's Cathedral, on Candlemas (2 February) 1942. In 1946, he both married Margaret Elizabeth Montagu, with whom he had two daughters, and resigned his vicarage (retaining the archdeaconry and suffragan see). He retired in 1954 and continued to serve the Church as an assistant bishop within the Diocese of Oxford; at his death, he lived in Little Wittenham, Berkshire, where he died at home.

References

External links

1883 births
1961 deaths
Military personnel from Middlesex
British Army officers
People from Highbury
People from Little Wittenham
20th-century Church of England bishops
Alumni of Exeter College, Oxford
Archdeacons of Berkshire
Bishops of Reading
British Army personnel of World War I
People educated at Magdalen College School, Oxford
Recipients of the Military Cross
Royal Army Chaplains' Department officers